The Kirk is a historic building located in Mason City, Iowa, United States.  Completed in 1903, this was the city's first luxury apartment building.  Horace P Kirk, who owned and managed the building, was a Mason City businessman, photographer, and civic leader.  He built two other buildings here and to the north that were destroyed in a fire in 1902.  This building was built on the site of Kirkland Flats, and parts of its stone foundation and north wall may be from the H.P. Kirk wholesale building that had been built in 1892.  Originally The Kirk supplied heat, light, and water for the apartments with its own steam generating plant.  It has subsequently acquired city utilities.  The building features an eclectic design that is organized into horizontal and vertical elements. The horizontal is realized in wide brick bands on the floors.  The vertical is realized in the copper-clad oriel windows that tie the second and third floors to the cornice.  The building was individually listed on the National Register of Historic Places in 1982, and as a contributing property in the Mason City Downtown Historic District in 2005.

References

Residential buildings completed in 1903
Apartment buildings in Mason City, Iowa
National Register of Historic Places in Mason City, Iowa
Apartment buildings on the National Register of Historic Places in Iowa
Victorian architecture in Iowa
Individually listed contributing properties to historic districts on the National Register in Iowa